Miranda Stone is a Canadian singer-songwriter originating from the Niagara-on-the-Lake, Ontario region and currently based in Toronto where she operates independent record label Earthdress Productions.

The title track of her album Seven Deadly Sins won the 2004 songwriting prize of the Ontario Council of Folk Festivals.

As of 2003 she had sold more than 10,000 copies of her first two discs.

Her paintings were among those on display at the Riverdale Art Walk, Toronto in June 2005.

During her career, she has toured in Canada, India and the United States. She is married to Chris Hale of Aradhna.

Discography
 Brave (1997)
 1,2, Trash a Few, 99, 100 (1999)
 7 Deadly Sins (2002)

References

External links
Miranda Stone's official site
Down The Line: review, 7 Deadly Sins

Mike Bullard Show: Miranda Stone performs "Seven Deadly Sins" (February 2004)
Phantom Tollbooth: review, 1 2 Trash a Few... 99, 100

Year of birth missing (living people)
Canadian women singers
Canadian singer-songwriters
Living people
Musicians from the Regional Municipality of Niagara
Musicians from Toronto
People from Niagara-on-the-Lake